The Häfeli DH-5 was a 1910s Swiss two-seat reconnaissance aircraft, built by the aircraft department of the Federal Construction Works (Eidgenoessische Konstruktionswerkstaette, K + W) at Thun, Switzerland.

Development and design
The Häfeli DH-5 was a two-seat reconnaissance aircraft designed by August Häfeli. It was a single-bay biplane of wood and fabric construction. The aircraft was powered by a 180 hp (134 kW) LFW I engine produced by the Swiss Locomotive and Machine Works. Test flying of the prototype commenced in March 1919 and 39 were ordered. Some aircraft were later modified with Handley Page slats. A second batch of 20 aircraft were powered by a 200 hp (149 kW) LFW II engine. A further batch of 20 aircraft designated the DH-5A used the LFW III engine.

Operational history
The DH-5 entered service in 1922 and was not withdrawn from service until 1940.

Variants

DH-5
Initial production version with either the LFW I or LFW II engine.
DH-5A
Version with a 220 hp (164 kw) LFW III engines, survivors were modified at Thun in 1932 with Handley Page slats and changes to allow crew to wear parachutes.
DH-5X
Trials aircraft powered by a Hispano-Suiza HS-42 (8Fb) engine imported from France. The aircraft was not ordered into production due lack of availability of the engines and the DH-5X crashed in 1933.

Operators

Swiss Air Force

Specifications (DH-5A)

References

1910s Swiss military reconnaissance aircraft
Biplanes
FFA aircraft
Single-engined tractor aircraft
Aircraft first flown in 1919